Watsa is a community in the Haut-Uele Province of the Democratic Republic of the Congo, administrative center of the Watsa Territory.

Watsa was the location of the VI battalion of the Force Publique in the 1940s and 1950s.

Between 1998 and 2000, co-circulating Marburg virus and Ravn virus caused 154 cases of Marburg virus disease and 128 deaths among illegal gold miners in Watsa and the nearby Durba Mine.
In January and February 2011 the Lords Resistance Army attacked people in the territories of Dungu, Faradje, Niangara and Watsa, causing 33,000 people to be displaced. They were slow to return due to the feeble response of government security forces.

Climate
Köppen-Geiger climate classification system classifies its climate as tropical monsoon (Am).

References

Populated places in Haut-Uélé